Oleiharenicola is a genus of bacteria from the family of Opitutaceae.

References

 

Verrucomicrobiota
Bacteria genera
Taxa described in 2018